Loch is a town in the South Gippsland region of Victoria, Australia which was established in 1876. The town was named in honour of the Governor of Victoria, Henry Loch.

Transport

Loch was formerly situated along the South Gippsland railway corridor that operated to its terminus at Yarram in the early 1980s and Leongatha in the mid 1990s. A V/Line road coach service replaced the rail service to Leongatha on July 24, 1993, running between Melbourne and Yarram. However, since the closure of the South Gippsland rail line with the exception of the locally run tourist railway between Nyora and Leongatha by the Kennett Victorian government on December 14, 1994, the South and West Gippsland Transport Group represented by the local council are campaigning for the rail services to be reinstated beyond the current terminus at Cranbourne by the 2020s.

The Great Southern Rail Trail follows the old South Gippsland railway line route from Loch to Port Welshpool.

References  

Towns in Victoria (Australia)
Shire of South Gippsland